United States women's national football team may refer to:

United States women's national American football team
United States women's national Australian rules football team
United States women's national soccer team